Crouch may refer to:

Places
 Crouch Island, Antarctica 
 Crouch, Swale, a hamlet within Boughton under Blean, Kent, England
 Crouch, Tonbridge and Malling, near Sevenoaks, Kent, England
 River Crouch, Essex, England
 Crouch, Idaho, United States
 Crouch, Virginia, United States

Other uses
 Crouch (surname)
 Crouch Cars, former British car maker

See also
 Al-Jathiya
 Burnham-on-Crouch, Essex, England
 Crouch End, North London, England
 Crouch Hill, North London, England
 Squatting position